Ahmed Houssein is a Djiboutian professional football manager.

Career
In 2007, he coached the Djibouti national football team.

References

External links
Profile at Soccerway.com
Profile at Soccerpunter.com

Year of birth missing (living people)
Living people
Djiboutian football managers
Djibouti national football team managers
Place of birth missing (living people)